121 South African Infantry Battalion is a motorised infantry unit of the South African Army.

History

Origin
A decision was made around 1979 to develop a Zulu speaking infantry battalion. On 20 January men who had reported for duty at the Jozini Base were sent to 21 SAI Battalion in Lenz near Johannesburg where 79 men completed training.

Garrison
On 23 April 1979, 121 SAI Battalion was established and allocated lines near an old Water Affairs compound at Jozini.
By 1980, a platoon of 121 SAI Battalion was despatched for duty in South West Africa (Namibia).

By 1981, 121 SAI Battalion was relocated to a new base at Dukuduku where the leopard head was adopted as the beret badge.
121 SAI Battalion received its national colours in 1989.

Freedom of the City was issued to 121 SAI Battalion by:
 uMhlanga in 1989 and
 Mtubatuba in 1994

SANDF's Motorised Infantry

SANDF's Motorised Infantry is transported mostly by Mamba Mk3 Armoured Personnel Carrier, SAMIL Trucks, or other un-protected motor vehicles.  SAMIL 20,  SAMIL 50 and  SAMIL 100 trucks transport soldiers, towing guns, and carrying equipment and supplies. SAMIL trucks are 2x4 and 4x6 drive, in order to have vehicles that function reliably in extremes of weather and terrain. Motorised infantry have an advantage in mobility allowing them to move to critical sectors of the battlefield faster, allowing better response to enemy movements, as well as the ability to outmaneuver the enemy.

Leadership

Insignia

Previous Dress Insignia

Current Dress Insignia

References 

Infantry battalions of South Africa
Infantry regiments of South Africa
Military units and formations established in 1979